The Sheykh ol-Eslam's house is a historical house in Isfahan, Iran. Built during the Qajar era, the house is built on the northern and southern sides of the large yard. The reason for this unusual plan, which is completely different from other historical houses in Isfahan, is that the yard had been built originally as a Tekyeh for religious ceremonies. The main parts of the structure are on the southern side of the yard behind a veranda. Stucco, decorations with cut mirrors and muqarnas have made this part of the house much more prominent. There is a big reception hall with two rooms behind the southern veranda, and there is a Howz and two small flower garden opposite the northern veranda. In the southwestern part of the house, there is a small courtyard, which is connected to the main courtyard by a narrow corridor.

Shaykh al-Islam House belongs to the Safavid - Qajar period located in Isfahan, which is the residence of Allameh Mohaghegh Sabzevari , Shaykh al-Islam of Isfahan and his descendants, and was registered on September 20, 1974, as one of the national monuments of Iran .

History and name  
The house or court of Shaykh al-Islam was built in the Safavid period and new decorations were added to it in the Qajar period. This house was the residence of Mohammad Baqir Sabzevari .

Building feature 
Existence of various decorations of Qajar period in the building, including decorative applications in the south porch and side rooms, plaster patterns in the earring rooms in detail and other rooms according to importance and also painting on plaster and mirrors on the flat roof of the south porch and various knot decorations on the door And windows are a prominent feature of this building.

Reasons for registering as a national work  
In addition to the cultural importance of its owner, Shaykh al-Islam's house has valuable architectural features. Developments in the building from the Safavid and Qajar periods to the Pahlavi period and recent reconstructions, this building has become a swimming pool in the course of architectural evolution in this land. This work was registered on September 20, 1974, with the registration number 997 as one of the national monuments. The main part of the house is owned by the Cultural Heritage Organization and its address is in Isfahan, Takhti intersection, Shaykh al-Islam alley.

Traditional Textile House 
The traditional textile house was opened in 2010 in the house of Shaykh al-Islam.
The Cultural Heritage Organization inaugurated a traditional textile house in Isfahan on February 7, 2011, at the Sheikh al-Islam House. It is open to the public from 8:30 until 14:15 every day except Fridays and all public holidays.

References

External links 
 Image

Museums in Isfahan
Houses in Iran
Historic house museums in Iran
Tourist attractions in Isfahan